Alexander McGlashan (c.1740 – May 1797) was a Scottish violinist, bandleader and editor of music collections.

Life
McGlashan flourished in Edinburgh, where he was a spirited leader of the most fashionable band in the city. He regularly gave concerts at St Cecilia's Hall. He was known as "King McGlashan" because of his commanding presence and showy style of dress.

He gave lessons to the violinist and composer Nathaniel Gow. He died in Edinburgh in May 1797, and was buried there in Greyfriars Kirkyard.

Publications
He edited three volumes of Scottish music:
 A Collection of Strathspey Reels (1780)
 A Collection of Scots Measures (1781)
 A Collection of Reels (1786)

References

 
 
 Nathaniel Gow electricscotland.com, accessed 27 March 2016
 John Glen Highland Music Trust, accessed 27 March 2016
 Page xxxii Edited by Peter Garside and Richard D. Jackson. The Forest Minstrel, Edinburgh University Press 2006.

1797 deaths
Scottish fiddlers
18th-century violinists
British male violinists
Burials at Greyfriars Kirkyard
Year of birth uncertain